TD Canada Trust, frequently shortened to simply TD, is the commercial banking operation of TD Bank Group in Canada. TD Canada Trust offers a range of financial services and products to more than 10 million Canadian customers through more than 1,100 branches and 2,600 ATMs.

In addition to the countrywide network of TD branches and ATMs in Canada, the bank has a network of mobile mortgage specialists, financial planners, private bankers, investment advisors, and portfolio managers.

The current TD Canada Trust division was formed after TD's acquisition of Canada Trust in 2000; prior to this merger, the institution's retail operations were branded TD Bank. All new and most existing accounts are officially issued by Toronto-Dominion Bank (Institution Number: 004), although Canada Trust (Institution Number: 509) remains a separate subsidiary entity, and it remains the issuer of accounts opened at that institution prior to the merger.

Since 2012, TD has been phasing out the "Canada Trust" part of its name from its logo online, in advertisements, and on stationery.

History

Canada Trust was formerly an independent company that was founded in 1864 in London, Ontario, as Huron and Erie Savings and Loan Society.

The company was acquired by TD Bank in 2000, which adopted the new brand name "TD Bank Financial Group". Canada Trust's retail division was merged with TD's existing retail banking operations over the course of 2000 to 2001 to collectively form "TD Canada Trust". Canada Trust's president and CEO, W. Edmund Clark, was made President and COO of TD, and he became president and CEO of TD Bank Financial Group in 2002.

TD in the media
Toronto-Dominion Bank has come under fire due to a series of articles published by CBC News that question its banking practices. The first article written to the Go Public portion of the CBC Business section was posted on 10 March 2017, under the title "'We do it because our jobs are at stake': TD bank employees admit to breaking the law for fear of being fired".

On 15 March 2017, another article was released by CBC News that reported thousands of banking employees from the top-five banks in Canada (RBC, BMO, CIBC, TD and Scotiabank) being pressured to meet unreasonable sales targets.

TD has been accused of pinkwashing for using its prominent sponsorship of Pride Toronto as a demographic marketing tool, while locking trans women out of their accounts if they attempt to access telephone banking in what the bank identifies as a "male voice" and mislabels as fraud. There have also been multiple complaints that depositors who purchased RRSPs from pre-merger TD Bank or Canada Trust have lost access to these funds as TD Canada Trust claims to have no record of the deposits, the pretext being that the institution is only required to retain records for seven years. There have also been cases where the bank has absolved itself of responsibility for theft or fraudulent access to depositors accounts by third parties, blaming the depositor for fraud which is no fault of their own.

Operations

TD Canada Trust markets itself as having longer hours than most major banks. Since late 2007, most branches are open 8–6 Monday to Wednesday (some until 8pm), 8–8 Thursday and Friday, and 8–4 on Saturday, with some exceptions for very low-traffic branches. As of February 2011, over 300 branches are open 11–4 on Sundays. All branches are closed on most statutory holidays.

Online banking
TD customers are able to do online banking through TD's EasyWeb system.  EasyWeb allows users to perform transactions, manage bills, update personal information, manage investments, and view banking histories.

In 2010, TD Canada Trust launched a mobile banking app for iOS, Android and BlackBerry platforms, allowing clients to perform many of the same transactions that are available through EasyWeb online banking.

In June 2012, TD Canada Trust introduced an enhanced Access Card with the new VISA Debit / Interac Flash Access Card which allows customers to use it via phone/online and at international merchants through the Visa network.

Services 
TD provides over 200 different languages on phone service for customers in Canada, including English, French, Mandarin and Cantonese. Five languages (English, French, Italian, Cantonese and Portuguese) are provided on ATMs.

See also

TD Canada Trust Tower, Calgary

References

External links

 

Toronto-Dominion Bank
Banks of Canada
Canadian companies established in 2000
Banks established in 2000
Companies based in Toronto
2000 establishments in Ontario